Dichomeris taiwana is a moth in the family Gelechiidae. It was described by Kyu-Tek Park and Ronald W. Hodges in 1995. It is found in Taiwan.

The length of the forewings is 6.5-7.2 mm. The forewings are light orange or pale greyish orange with scattered dark brown scales and often with several brown streaks extending longitudinally along the fold. There is a dark brown fascia along the anterior and posterior margins and a well-developed dark fuscous fascia along the termen anteriorly. The hindwings are grey.

References

Moths described in 1995
taiwana